The Gangotri Group of mountains is a subdivision of the Garhwal Himalaya in the northern Indian state of Uttarakhand. It rings the Gangotri Glacier, and contains peaks that are notable either for their religious significance to Hindus, for their difficult climbing routes, or both. Climbs on three of the peaks (Thalay Sagar, Shivling, and Meru) have resulted in the awarding of the prestigious (but controversial) climbing award, the Piolet d'Or. 

Notable mountains include:

 Chaukhamba (I-IV). A four-summitted massif; Chaukhamba I, is the highest peak in the group.
 Kedarnath (Mountain), the highest peak on the southwest side of the glacier
 Thalay Sagar, a steep rock spire, and perhaps the most difficult summit to attain in the entire group.
 Shivling, another steep rock peak, with two summits, and the most striking as viewed from Gaumukh, the pilgrimage site at the mouth of the glacier. A symbol of the god Shiva, it is the most revered peak in the group.
 Meru, lies between Thalay Sagar and Shivling, and has some highly challenging routes, only recently ascended despite multiple attempts by the world's best climbers.
 Bhagirathi I:  ; II: ; III:  ], peaks with moderate routes on the back sides, but huge steep-to-overhanging cliffs on the side facing the glacier. Bhagirathi III, in particular, has seen some of the most extreme rock climbing in the Himalaya.

References
 H. Adams Carter, "Classification of the Himalaya", American Alpine Journal, 1985, pp. 139–141.
 Andy Fanshawe and Stephen Venables, Himalaya Alpine-Style, Hodder and Stoughton, 1995, pp. 108–111.
 Ed Douglas, "Shivling", in World Mountaineering (Audrey Salkeld, editor), Bulfinch Press, 1998, pp. 258–261.

Mountains of Uttarakhand